Malik "Poot" Carr is a fictional character on the HBO drama The Wire, played by actor Tray Chaney. Poot starts out as a drug dealer in the Barksdale Organization who slowly rises through the ranks. He eventually ends up leaving the drug trade after its violent nature causes the death of his best friend Bodie Broadus and many other of his friends. He has the distinction, along with Wee-Bey Brice, Omar Little, Bubbles, and Proposition Joe, of being one of the only characters in the drug trade to appear in every season.

Of the 17 front-line Barksdale Organization gang members featured in the series, 12 die and three more are imprisoned with long sentences. Poot in many ways is the "sole survivor", and the foil to the heavy casualties suffered particularly by Barksdale's organization. This is despite the fact that he survives being shot at three times, more times than any other character except Omar Little. Poot distinguishes himself from the other two remaining survivors, Slim Charles and Dennis "Cutty" Wise, as the only low-level player who is able to completely move away from drug trade after the organization's collapse.

Biography

Season 1
In season 1, Poot works in the low rise projects territory called "the pit", under D'Angelo Barksdale, and is friends with fellow dealers Bodie and Wallace. He has a very active sex life, and at one point the police detail investigating the Barksdale Organization listens in on him having phone sex with a girlfriend. He is depicted as being a contemporary of Bodie and Wallace's, making him about 16 when the show starts.

Poot is trapped in the stash house with other members of his crew when Omar robs it. Although he doesn't get hurt, Poot is terrified enough to vomit when Omar leaves. Poot and Wallace spot Brandon, Omar's boyfriend and accomplice in the heist, and Wallace reports the sighting to D'Angelo, even though Poot doesn't believe anyone will come. Stringer Bell arrives soon afterwards with a trio of enforcers. 

Poot is not as affected as Wallace by Brandon's tortured body's being displayed in their neighborhood as a warning to Omar. In contrast, the trauma drives Wallace to stop working for the organization. Poot tries to get Wallace to return to work but is unsuccessful. Poot follows Wallace and realizes he has turned to drugs to escape his problems. He covers for Wallace with D'Angelo for some time but eventually tells D'Angelo the truth.

Poot's close friendship with Wallace is evident as he stays in touch with Wallace after the police move Wallace away to the country. Wallace tells Poot he has chosen to move to live with relatives, but in reality he had become a police informant and had been moved for his protection.

Stringer Bell orders Bodie to kill Wallace after growing suspicious of Wallace's return to the projects after his long absence. During the lead up to the hit, Poot's closer friendship with Wallace made him the less confident than Bodie about the kill; however, when they cornered the fearful Wallace, who pleaded with his friends, Bodie showed much more hesitation. Only after Poot urged him to finish it did Bodie pull the trigger. Although Bodie fired the initial shot, Poot took the gun from him and finished Wallace off himself, wanting to free his friend from his suffering.

After the arrest of his one-time mentor and crew chief D'Angelo, Poot's willingness to continue to serve the Barksdale Organization was shown when he stepped into the position by helping Bodie physically force away a rival drug gang. In the closing scenes of season 1, Poot is seen running the Pit, notably repeating some of the earlier lessons taught to him by D'Angelo to the crew currently working for him.

Season 2
In season 2, Poot is still running the pit. However, he has difficulty controlling his subordinates and struggles with the poor quality product available to the crew. He is significant enough to the organization to attend Stringer's strategy meetings at a funeral home. He continues to work with Bodie who is now in control of his own tower and overseeing the pit. Bodie and Poot become embroiled in a turf dispute with an independent crew that leads to a firefight, in which Bodie, Poot and Puddin fight off six attackers. A child is killed by a stray bullet.

Season 3
In season 3, the city's demolition of the public housing towers forces the Barksdale organization out of its prime territory - in the cold open of the season premiere, Poot expresses his sadness at the loss of the towers, revealing that he lost his virginity in one of the buildings. It is during this sequence that Bodie reveals Poot's given name is Malik Carr. Poot remains in charge of his own crew, but now works on a street corner. Because of its move to street corners, the Barksdale organization becomes embroiled in a turf war with the rival Stanfield Organization. 

Barksdale enforcer Slim Charles assures Poot that he will be safe to selling narcotics when the Barksdales try to expand into Stanfield territory and provides him with more muscle as protection. Poot narrowly escapes being shot in a drive-by on his corner carried out by Stanfield soldier Snoop, which kills Barksdale soldier Rico. At the close of season 3, Poot and most of the other Barksdale members are arrested, having been implicated in drug dealing by a police wiretap.

Season 4
In the second half of season 4, Poot is released from prison after serving 15 months of a four-year prison sentence and immediately goes back to work with Bodie's crew. He is unhappy to learn that they are now working under Avon's old rival Marlo Stanfield but does not seem to mind the change too much.

Poot is a source of advice for Bodie, who often looked to his old friend for help when trying to determine how to view Marlo's cutthroat operations. Poot is with Bodie and Spider when Marlo's crew attacks Bodie's corner. When it becomes clear that they are outnumbered, and that Bodie would rather die than flee, Poot flees the scene, while Bodie chooses to fight. Bodie is soon shot to death. 

When Jimmy McNulty later asks Poot who killed Bodie, Poot tells him that he blames the police for his friend's murder, as Stanfield's lieutenant, Monk Metcalf, saw Bodie getting into a car with McNulty. Poot is briefly shown in the final montage of the season working for Michael Lee, who took over Bodie's corner.

Season 5
Poot is briefly seen working at a shoe store where Dukie comes in looking for a job. Poot recognizes Dukie and admits he used to work the corners, but says that he got tired of drug dealing and decided to get a legitimate job instead, because similar to Dennis "Cutty" Wise, dealing "got old" for Poot.  He tells Dukie he won't get hired because he is not old enough, and that he should come back after working the corners for a couple more years.

References

Carr, Poot
Carr, Poot
Carr, Poot
Carr, Poot
Carr, Poot
Carr, Poot
Carr, Poot
Male characters in television
Fictional murderers of children